"Do You Remember" is the second single by British R&B artist Jay Sean from his American-debut album, All or Nothing. The song features Jamaican dancehall musician Sean Paul and American crunk rapper Lil Jon. The song was produced by J-Remy and Bobby Bass.

The song was released to U.S. radio stations on 20 October 2009 and released as a digital download on iTunes on 3 November 2009. It is Sean's second single to enter the top ten on the Billboard Hot 100, making him the first male act since Chingy in 2003 to "simultaneously appear in the Hot 100 top 10 with his first two charting singles from a debut release." The single has sold more than a million digital copies in the United States alone. It was later released in the UK on 22 February 2010.

The song was also featured at the start of the 2010 film remake of The Karate Kid.

Background

Speaking in February 2010 to noted UK R&B writer Pete Lewis of the award-winning Blues & Soul, Jay explained the background to the track:

Composition
"Do You Remember" is recorded in the key of B major in common time at a tempo of 126 beats per minute.  The song follows a chord progression of B–F–Cm–E, while the vocals span from E3 to F4.

Variations
There are two versions of the song.
First was recorded with Sean Paul, and was chosen as the radio version. 
The second version is the single and album version with Sean Paul and Lil Jon and was completed in September 2009 where Lil Jon provides additional ad-libs.

Track listing
 iTunes digital download
 "Do You Remember" (featuring Sean Paul & Lil Jon) – 3:31

UK Single CD
 "Do You Remember" (featuring Sean Paul & Lil Jon) – 3:31
 "Do You Remember" (Ruff Loaderz Remix)
 "Do You Remember" (Hitty Remix)

Official versions
 "Do You Remember" (Album Version) (featuring Sean Paul & Lil Jon) – 3:31
 "Do You Remember" (Hitty Remix)
 "Do You Remember" (Ruff Loaderz Remix)

Music video 
The video was shot in Los Angeles on 11 November 2009 with Sean Paul and Lil Jon and was directed by Gil Green. It features Sean, Paul and Lil Jon in a New York City block party setting and features cameos, whatever, used in the films by DJ Paul of Three 6 Mafia, Tyga, Birdman and Kevin Rudolf. The lead girl in the video is the model Jessica Vilchis, who plays the role of Jay Sean's love interest in the music video.

The video was also somewhat of a homage to Michael Jackson's "The Way You Make Me Feel" video.

On 3 December 2009, the video premiered on BET. It later had an online world premiere on VEVO on 13 December 2009, and it has nearly 35 million views as of 23 August 2010. As of 2022, the video has over 192 million views.

Reception
DJBooth commented, "like 'Down', this jam has undeniable club/radio appeal – thanks in large part to J remy & Bobby Bass' upbeat, string-led instrumental – which sounds a lot like their boardwork on Down. "Do You Remember" may not be a drastic departure from its predecessor, but Sean's recipe for number-one success yields an equally appetising result the second time around."

"Do You Remember" was the VIP track on UK music channel 4Music on the week commencing 17 January 2010.

Airplay
On 25 January 2010, "Do You Remember" reached a peak of number 1 on the Hot30 Countdown.

Chart performance
In the United States, "Do You Remember" debuted at No. 27 on the Billboard Hot 100 for the chart week of 21 November 2009, making it Sean's highest debut charting single on the Hot 100. On the issue dated 9 January 2010, the song entered the top ten of the Hot 100 at No. 10, thus doubling Sean's presence on the top ten with "Down" also being at No. 7 that same week. On the Pop Songs chart, which measures airplay on U.S. Mainstream pop radio stations, the song peaked at No. 5 for the chart week ending 13 February 2010. On the Canadian Hot 100, it debuted at No. 55 for the chart week of 12 November 2009, so far peaking at No. 11 two months later for the chart week of 23 January 2010.

On the New Zealand Singles Chart, the song debuted at No. 23 on the week ending 30 November 2009, and has so far peaked at No. 11 on the week ending 8 February 2010. Despite the song not being officially released as a single in the United Kingdom until 22 February 2010, the song debuted on the UK Singles Chart at No. 83 and on the UK Indie Chart at No. 6. It has so far peaked at No. 14 on the UK Singles Chart on the week dated 13 February 2010. On the Australian ARIA Charts, the single debuted at No. 43 on the week ending 4 January 2010, when it was the only new entry to enter the Australian Top 50 that week. It has so far peaked at No. 7 on the week ending 15 February 2010. The song has also debuted on the European Hot 100 chart, at No. 75, on the chart week dated 6 February 2010, and has so far peaked at No. 39 on the chart week dated 27 February 2010. The song has also reached No. 11 on the Japan Hot 100 on the chart week dated 6 March 2010. That same week on Billboard Japan, it reached No. 10 on the Adult Contemporary chart and No. 8 on the Hot Top Airplay chart.

Charts

Weekly charts

Year-end charts

Sales and certifications

Release history

References

2009 singles
Jay Sean songs
Lil Jon songs
Sean Paul songs
Songs about nostalgia
Songs written by Sean Paul
Songs written by Jay Sean
Cash Money Records singles
Music videos directed by Gil Green
Songs written by Jared Cotter
Songs written by Lil Jon
2009 songs